Short Beach Island, Short Beach or Tucker's Island was a barrier island located on the Jersey Shore of the Atlantic Ocean. Little Beach is a remnant of Short Beach; the northern remnant was encroached upon and attached to Long Beach Island before succumbing to erosion.

Geography
Short Beach was located southwest of Long Beach Island and northeast of Brigantine Island.

History
Short Beach first appears as a named feature on the 1777 map of New Jersey by William Faden, where it is labeled as a part of Brigantine Beach called Mihannon Shoal.
Short Beach Island and its demise was described in 1878, viz.,

In time, the northern remnant of Short Beach came to be known as Tucker's Island.

The Annual Report of the New Jersey State Geologist for 1905 addressed and described the dynamic of the opening and closing of inlets in the Little Egg Harbor area:

A lighthouse was established on Tucker's Island in 1848. Unmanned, this facility was closed in 1860. After the close of the American Civil War, the manned Little Egg Harbor Lighthouse was activated. This remained in operation until 1927, when erosion rendered the structure unsafe. A United States Life-Saving Service station was established on the island in 1856, and was in operation until the early 1930s, when it, too, became unsafe due to erosion.

In the late nineteenth century, an attempt was made at the development of a seaside resort known as Sea Haven. Two hotels were constructed, which enjoyed some success for several years until competition from more accessible resorts drew business away. In 1907 another attempt at development, St. Albans by the Sea, was attempted, but was not successful.

By the 1920s, Beach Haven Inlet had opened, which once again severed Tucker's Island from Long Beach Island, and increased erosion to an alarming rate. By 1927 the lighthouse was undermined to the point where it had to be abandoned; it collapsed into the ocean on October 12 of that year. The Life Saving station followed in the early 1930s. The island had completely disappeared by 1950.

An ephemeral, intertidal island labeled on modern nautical charts as Tucker's Island has emerged in recent years at the approximate former location.

References

Landforms of Atlantic County, New Jersey
Landforms of Ocean County, New Jersey
Barrier islands of New Jersey
Islands of New Jersey